This is an alphabetical list of works performed by American Ballet Theatre, a classical ballet company based at the Metropolitan Opera House, New York City.

References

External links
Repertory Archive, American Ballet Theatre

 Works performed by American Ballet Theatre, List of
American Ballet Theatre, List of works performed by the